Bert Turner may refer to:
Bert Turner (politician) (1888–1973), member of the Queensland Legislative Assembly
Bert Turner (footballer, born 1899) (1899–1953), English footballer who played for Merthyr Town, Coventry City, Torquay United and Bristol Rovers
Bert Turner (footballer, born 1907) (1907–1959), English footballer
Bert Turner (footballer, born 1909) (1909–1981), Welsh international footballer who played for Charlton Athletic
Hubert Turner, cricketer, see List of Leeward Islands first-class cricketers

See also
Albert Turner (disambiguation)
Robert Turner (disambiguation)
Herbert Turner (disambiguation)